The following highways are numbered 227:

Canada
 Manitoba Provincial Road 227
 Prince Edward Island Route 227
 Quebec Route 227

China
 China National Highway 227

Costa Rica
 National Route 227

India
 National Highway 227 (India)

Israel
 Route 227 (Israel)

Japan
 Japan National Route 227

United States
 U.S. Route 227 (former)
 Alabama State Route 227
 California State Route 227
 Colorado State Highway 227
 Florida State Road 227 (former)
 Georgia State Route 227
 Indiana State Road 227
 Kentucky Route 227
 Maine State Route 227
 Maryland Route 227
 M-227 (Michigan highway)
 Minnesota State Highway 227
 Montana Secondary Highway 227
 Nevada State Route 227
 New York State Route 227
 Oregon Route 227
 Pennsylvania Route 227
 Tennessee State Route 227
 Texas State Highway 227 (former)
 Utah State Route 227
 Virginia State Route 227